Aloys Bertrand Nong (born 16 October 1983 in Douala) is a Cameroonian footballer.

Club career
Nong was born in Douala. He moved to Belgium in 2000, aged 16, and signed with SC Eendracht Aalst. In the 2002 summer Nong joined C.S. Visé, and after a short loan spell at Royal de Liège he quickly established himself as a starter.

In January 2005, Nong joined KV Kortrijk, after a six-month spell at FC Brussels. After featuring regularly for the side he moved to KV Mechelen in July 2007. This is around the same time he secured a lucrative deal with Geox shoes.

On 31 August 2010 Nong joined Standard Liège for a € 1.25 million fee. In January 2012, however, he rescinded his link and agreed to a three and a half year deal with RAEC Mons.

On 7 August 2013 Nong signed a three-year deal with La Liga side Levante UD. He made his debut in the competition on 3 November, replacing Rubén García in the 76th minute of a 0–1 home loss against Granada CF.

After appearing rarely with the Valencian side, Nong was loaned to Recreativo de Huelva on 30 January 2014. He returned to the Granotes in June, and rescinded his link on 1 September.

Iran

Nong signed for Iranian club Foolad in the middle of the 2014–2015 season and played in the AFC Champions League with the team. At the end of the season he left the club and signed with Naft Tehran. Nong scored on 21 September 2015 in a 2–1 loss against Esteghlal at the famous Azadi Stadium. He was sold by Naft midway through the season because of financial issues.

Nong joined Tractor for the second half of the 2015–16 season. His contract was not extended and he was released at the end of the season. He spent the first half of the 2016–17 season as a free agent before signing a 6-month contract with Iranian champions Esteghlal Khuzestan on 12 December 2016.

Honours
Standard Liège
Belgian Cup: 2010–11

References

External links
 
 
 

1983 births
Living people
Cameroonian footballers
Cameroonian expatriate footballers
Kadji Sports Academy players
K.V. Mechelen players
Footballers from Douala
K.V. Kortrijk players
C.S. Visé players
RFC Liège players
R.W.D.M. Brussels F.C. players
Standard Liège players
R.A.E.C. Mons players
Levante UD footballers
Recreativo de Huelva players
Foolad FC players
Naft Tehran F.C. players
Esteghlal Khuzestan players
Tractor S.C. players
Pars Jonoubi Jam players
Saipa F.C. players
Challenger Pro League players
Belgian Pro League players
La Liga players
Cameroonian expatriate sportspeople in Belgium
Expatriate footballers in Belgium
Expatriate footballers in Spain
Association football forwards
Segunda División players
Persian Gulf Pro League players